The 10th African Swimming Championships were held September 13–19, 2010 in Casablanca, Morocco. The event was hosted by the Royal Moroccan Swimming Federation. It featured pool competition in a 50m (long course) pool; and Open Water races.

Competition locations were:
pool: Mohammed V Sport Complex (Complexe sportif Mohammed V)
open water: Sidi Abbed beach in Temara.

Participating countries
Over 200 swimmers from 21 countries participated in the 10th Championships, making it the largest ever (both in terms of number of swimmers and number of countries). Countries which sent teams were:

1

1 While swimmers from Cameroon entered the Championships, they did not attend the meet (reportedly because they could not afford the plane tickets to Morocco).

Schedule

Preliminary heats began at 10:00 am; finals at 4:00 pm Open Water races began at 10:00 am

Results

Men

Women

Medal standings
Final medal standings for the 2010 African Swimming Championships are:

References

African Swimming Championships
African Swimming Championships, 2010
S
Swimming competitions in Morocco
2010 in Moroccan sport
International sports competitions hosted by Morocco